Dysoxylum oppositifolium is a tree in the family Meliaceae. The specific epithet  is from the Latin meaning "opposite leaf", referring to the leaves being on opposite sides of the stem.

Description
The bark is yellow-brown. The flowers are creamish-coloured.

Distribution and habitat
Dysoxylum oppositifolium is found in Borneo, the Philippines, New Guinea and northeast Australia.

References

External links

oppositifolium
Trees of Borneo
Trees of the Philippines
Trees of New Guinea
Trees of Australia
Plants described in 1866
Taxa named by Ferdinand von Mueller